Box product may refer to:

 The scalar triple product of three vectors
 A cartesian product of topological spaces equipped with the box topology
 The cartesian product of graphs